British Rail Mark 5 may refer to:
British Rail Mark 5 (InterCity 250), an unbuilt type of coach intended as part of the planned InterCity 250 project for the West Coast Main Line
British Rail Mark 5 (CAF), a type of passenger coach being built for Caledonian Sleeper
British Rail Mark 5A, a type of passenger coach being built for TransPennine Express